Beykonak is a village in the Tercan District, Erzincan Province, Turkey. The village had a population of 56 in 2021.

The hamlet of Çatak is attached to the village.

References 

Villages in Tercan District